Flatwoods is an unincorporated community located in the Lillington Township of Harnett County, North Carolina, United States. It is a part of the Dunn Micropolitan Area, which is also a part of the greater Raleigh–Durham–Cary Combined Statistical Area (CSA) as defined by the United States Census Bureau.

Landmarks
Flatwoods Community is located along U.S. Route 401 between Lillington and Bunnlevel. It is home to a few businesses, a few churches a fire department, a defunct golf course and a gravel pit.

External links
 Flatwoods Community Fire Department

References 

Unincorporated communities in Harnett County, North Carolina
Unincorporated communities in North Carolina